The Roman Catholic Archdiocese of Manila is the archdiocese of the Latin Church of the Catholic Church in Metro Manila, Philippines, encompassing the cities of Manila, Makati, San Juan, Mandaluyong, and Pasay. The cathedral church is a minor basilica located in Intramuros, which comprises the old city of Manila. The Blessed Virgin Mary, under the title Immaculate Conception, is the principal patroness of the archdiocese.

The Archdiocese of Manila is the oldest diocese in the Philippines, created in 1579 as a diocese and elevated as a metropolitan archdiocese in 1595. Since its last territorial changes in 2003, the Archdiocese of Manila is the metropolitan see of the ecclesiastical province of the same name, which also include five dioceses encompassing most of the National Capital Region (Novaliches, Parañaque, Cubao, Kalookan, and Pasig) and four dioceses of its surrounding provinces of Cavite (Diocese of Imus), Rizal and Marikina City (Diocese of Antipolo), Bulacan and Valenzuela City (Diocese of Malolos), and Laguna (Diocese of San Pablo).

In addition, the Archdiocese also serves as the de facto overseer of the Military Ordinariate of the Philippines, as well as the Apostolic Vicariates of Puerto Princesa and Taytay in Palawan, all exempt dioceses of the Holy See (with the vicariates under the jurisdiction of the Congregation for the Evangelization of Peoples).

The archdiocese also owns and manages institutions located outside its own territorial jurisdiction and belonging on jurisdictions of other dioceses: two retreat houses in the dioceses of Baguio and Antipolo and seminary in the diocese of Parañaque, as well as the radio station DZRV Radio Veritas 846 kHz and the EDSA Shrine in the diocese of Cubao. Additionally, the archdiocese is a shareholder of the Bank of the Philippine Islands.

Its suffragan diocese of Malolos in Bulacan, along with the dioceses of San Jose and Cabanatuan in Nueva Ecija (both suffragans of Archdiocese of Lingayen-Dagupan), and Balanga (Bataan), Iba (Zambales) and Tarlac (Tarlac; suffragans of the Archdiocese of San Fernando), form the group of dioceses in Central Luzon.

Since June 24, 2021, Jose Cardinal Advincula is the Archbishop of Manila.

History

Per the efforts of conquistador Martín de Goiti – who founded the City of Manila by uniting the dominions of Sulayman III of Namayan, Sabag, Rajah Ache Matanda of Maynila who was a vassal to the Sultan of Brunei, and Lakan Dula of Tondo who was a tributary to Ming dynasty China – the Diocese of Manila was established on February 6, 1579, through the papal bull Illius Fulti Præsidio by Pope Gregory XIII, encompassing all Spanish colonies in Asia as a suffragan of the Archdiocese of Mexico. Fray Domingo de Salazar, a Dominican from the Convent of San Sebastian in Salamanca, Spain, was selected by King Philip II of Spain to be bishop of the new diocese and was presented to the pope.

Over the course of history and growth of Catholicism in the Philippines, the diocese was elevated and new dioceses had been carved from its territory. On August 14, 1595, Pope Clement VIII raised the diocese to the status of an archdiocese with Bishop Ignacio Santibáñez its first archbishop. Three new dioceses were created as suffragans to Manila: Nueva Cáceres, Nueva Segovia, and Cebu. With the creation of these new dioceses, the territory of the archdiocese was reduced to the city of Manila and the adjoining civil provinces in proximity including Mindoro Island.  It was bounded to the north by the Diocese of Nueva Segovia, to the south by the Diocese of Cebu, and to the southeast by the Diocese of Nueva Cáceres.

During the Hispanic period, the archdiocese was ruled by a succession of Spanish and Latino archbishops. The British occupation of Manila during the Seven Years' War saw the temporary conversion of Sultan Azim ud-Din I of Sulu to Catholicism, the massive looting and destruction of ecclesiastical treasures, as well as the burning of churches by British soldiers, Sepoy mercenaries, and rebellious Chinese residents in Binondo. This episode was particularly damaging to Philippine scholarship due to the fact that the monasteries holding the archives and artifacts about the pre-colonial Philippine Rajahnates, Kedatuans, Sultanates, Lakanates, and Wangdoms and their conversion to Catholicism were either burnt, lost, or looted by the British. An example would be the Boxer Codex, whose earliest owner Lord Giles of Ilchester had inherited it from an ancestor who stole it from Manila during the British Occupation.

Nevertheless, peace was subsequently restored after the Protestant British occupation. In the time after this, the Catholic religious orders (with the exception of the Jesuits who were temporarily suppressed by the Spaniards due to their role in anti-imperialist movements in Latin America) became the powerful driving force in the Archdiocese of Manila. The local diocesan clergy resented the foreign religious orders due to their near monopoly of ecclesiastical positions. The opposition of the religious orders against an autonomous diocesan clergy independent of them lead to the martyrdom of priests Mariano Gomez, José Burgos, Jacinto Zamora collectively known as Gomburza. This inspired the Jesuit educated Jose Rizal to form the La Liga Filipina, to ask for reforms from Spain and recognition of local clergy.

Rizal was executed and the La Liga Filipina dissolved. The 1896 Philippine revolution was triggered when the Spanish discovered the anti-colonial secret organisation Katipunan, leading to the end of Spanish rule. The United States took the Philippines from Spain in the 1898 Spanish–American War; this developed into fighting between the Philippine revolutionaries and the U.S. in the 1899–1902 Philippine–American War, followed by victory for the U.S. and disestablishment of the Roman Catholic Church as the state church of the Philippines. In the period after the war, Philippine churches were restored in the Art-Deco architectural motif. There was a looming threat of apostasy and schism with the rise of anti-clerical Philippine Freemasonry and the establishment of the Philippine Independent Church due to Filipino anger against Spanish ecclesiastical corruption. In response, the Vatican supported Philippine independence and applied a policy of reinforcing orthodoxy and reconciliation which resulted in the majority of the Filipinos remaining faithful to the Roman Catholic Church and having a good number of those separated from the Church grafted back.

The province of Mindoro was established as an independent diocese on April 10, 1910, by virtue of a Decretum Consistoriale signed by Pope Pius X, implementing the bull Quae Mari Sinico of Pope Leo XIII. On the same date, the Diocese of Lipa was created, with jurisdiction over the provinces of Batangas, Tayabas, Marinduque, and some parts of Masbate. In May 1928, Pope Pius XI established the Diocese of Lingayen, carved from Manila and Nueva Segovia. In this creation, 26 parishes were separated from Manila. He also named Our Lady of Guadalupe as a patroness of the Filipino people in 1938.

December 8, 1941, marked the beginning of the Japanese occupation of the Philippines. Members of the secretive Black Dragon Society had infiltrated all facets of Philippine life and had greatly guided the invading Japanese forces. World War II marked a period of irreplaceable loss to the Archdiocese of Manila.  The combination of violent theft and arson done by the Japanese and indiscriminate carpet bombing by the Americans during the Battle of Manila (1945) lead to the permanent loss of many of the ancient Gothic, Art-Deco, and Earthquake Baroque churches.

In the aftermath of the war, in September 1942, Pope Pius XII declared Our Lady of Immaculate Conception as the Principal Patroness of the Philippines by virtue of the papal bull, Impositi Nobis, along with Saints Pudentiana and Rose of Lima as secondary patrons.

Due to the heavy damages resulting from World War II, the Manila Cathedral underwent major rebuilding from 1946 to 1958. The Parish of San Miguel served as pro-cathedral or temporary cathedral of the local church until the Manila Cathedral was reopened and consecrated in 1958.

On December 11, 1948, the Apostolic Constitution Probe Noscitur further divided the Archdiocese of Manila by placing the northern part of the local church in the new Diocese of San Fernando. On November 25, 1961, the Archdiocese of Manila was again partitioned with the creation of the Diocese of Malolos for the province of Bulacan in the north and the Diocese of Imus for the province of Cavite in the South.

Pope John Paul II declared the Manila Cathedral a minor basilica in 1981 through the motu proprio Quod ipsum, issued as a papal bull. In 1983, the province of Rizal, together with the city of Marikina and the northeastern part of Pasig, was placed under the new Diocese of Antipolo.

The archdiocese witnessed many grace-filled church events such as the Second Synod of Manila (1911), the Third Synod of Manila (1925), the 33rd International Eucharistic Congress (1937), the First Plenary Council of the Philippines (1953), the papal visit of Pope Paul VI (1970), the Fourth Synod of Manila (1979), the papal visits of Pope John Paul II (the first in 1981 and the second in 1995), the National Marian Year (1985), the National Eucharistic Year (1987), the Second Plenary Council of the Philippines (1991), the Second Provincial Council of Manila (1996), the 4th World Meeting of Families (2003), and the papal visit of Pope Francis (2015).

In 2002, two more dioceses were carved out of the Archdiocese: the Diocese of Novaliches and the Diocese of Parañaque. In 2003, three more dioceses were erected: Cubao, Kalookan, and Pasig.

Coat of arms
The arms of the metropolitan see of Manila is an adaptation of the arms granted by Philip II of Spain to the "insigne y siempre leal (distinguished and ever loyal)" city of Manila in 1596. The silver crescent represents the Immaculate Conception, patroness of the Manila Cathedral and of the entire Philippines. The tower represents God himself whom the psalmist calls in Psalms 60 turris fortis contra inimicum (turris fortitudinis a facie inimici in the Gallician psalter). The three windows make the tower represent the Blessed Trinity: Father, Son and Holy Ghost, three Persons in one God. The sea lion represents the Philippines, then-an overseas territory of Spain, and the pilgrim's cross which may be easily fixed on the ground symbolizes both the faith of the Filipino people and their missionary role in spreading that faith.

Archbishops

The seat of the archbishop is at Manila Cathedral. After the first bishop of Manila Domingo de Salazar, the diocese became an archdiocese and there have been nineteen archbishops of Spanish origin. In 1903, the archdiocese received its first American archbishop, Jeremiah James Harty from St. Louis, Missouri. After him, the Irishman Michael J. O'Doherty was appointed in 1916. O'Doherty would lead the church during a period when Filipinos were petitioning for sovereignty from the United States and during the Japanese Occupation of the Philippines during World War II.

When O'Doherty died after Philippine independence in 1946, the coadjutor archbishop Gabriel M. Reyes became the first native Filipino in the position. Reyes' successor, Archbishop Rufino Jiao Santos, became the first Filipino to become a cardinal in 1960. On January 21, 1974, Pope Paul VI appointed then-Archbishop of Jaro Jaime Sin as the 30th Archbishop of Manila. He was named cardinal in 1976. In 2003, the archdiocese received Gaudencio Rosales, Archbishop of Lipa, as successor to Cardinal Sin. Pope Benedict XVI later elevated Rosales to the cardinalate on March 24, 2006. On October 13, 2011, Luis Antonio Gokim Tagle, then Bishop of Imus, was named archbishop and was later made a cardinal by Benedict XVI on November 24, 2012. On December 8, 2019, he was appointed by Pope Francis to be the prefect of Congregation for the Evangelization of Peoples. In March 2020, Philippine President Duterte said the Pope had removed Tagle from his post in Manila for channeling church funds to the President's political opponents. The Catholic Bishops' Conference of the Philippines (CBCP) and many individual Philippine prelates denounced Duterte's charge. Auxiliary Bishop Broderick Pabillo lead the archdiocese as Apostolic Administrator for 17 months during the COVID-19 pandemic, until Tagle's successor, then-Archbishop of Capiz, José Fuerte Advíncula took office in June 24, 2021.

List of Archbishops of Manila

Coadjutor Archbishops
Romualdo J. Ballesteros (1845–1846), did not succeed to see; appointed Bishop of Cebu 
Gabriel M. Reyes (1949–1952)

Auxiliary Bishops
Ginés Barrientos (1680–1698)
Jose Maria Segui Molas (1829–1830), appointed 21st Archbishop of Manila
William Finnemann (1929–1936), appointed Prefect of Mindoro
Cesar Maria Guerrero y Gutierrez (1937–1949), appointed Bishop of San Fernando
Rufino Jiao Santos (1947–1953), appointed as 29th Archbishop; made Cardinal by John XXIII in 1960
Vicente Posada Reyes (1950–1961), appointed Bishop of Borongan
Hernando Izquierdo Antiporda (1954–1975)
Pedro Bantigue y Natividad (1961–1967), appointed Bishop of San Pablo
Bienvenido M. Lopez (1966–1995)
Artemio G. Casas (1968–1974), appointed Archbishop of Jaro
Amado Paulino y Hernandez (1969–1985)
Gaudencio Borbon Rosales (1974–1982), appointed Coadjutor Bishop of Malaybalay; later appointed as 31st Archbishop; made Cardinal by Benedict XVI in 2006
Oscar Valero Cruz (1976–1978), appointed Archbishop of San Fernando
Protacio G. Gungon (1977–1983), appointed Bishop of Antipolo
Leonardo Legaspi (1977–1984), appointed Archbishop of Caceres (Nueva Caceres)
Manuel C. Sobreviñas (1979–1993), appointed Bishop of Imus
Gabriel V. Reyes (1981–1992), appointed Bishop of Kalibo
Teodoro J. Buhain, Jr. (1983–2003)
Teodoro Bacani (1984–2002) appointed Bishop of Novaliches 
Leoncio L. Lat (1985–1992)
Ramon Arguelles (1993–1995), appointed Military Ordinary of the Philippines
Crisostomo A. Yalung (1994–2001), appointed Bishop of Antipolo
Rolando Joven Tria Tirona (1994–1996), appointed Bishop of Malolos
Jesse E. Mercado (1997–2002), appointed Bishop of Parañaque
Socrates B. Villegas (2001–2004), appointed Bishop of Balanga
Bernardino C. Cortez (2004–2014), appointed Prelate of Infanta
Broderick S. Pabillo (2006–2021) appointed Vicar Apostolic of Taytay

Other priests of this diocese who became bishops
Francisco Sales Reyes y Alicante, appointed Bishop of now Archdiocese of Caceres in 1925
Arnaldo Catalan, Appointed Apostolic Nuncio to Rwanda in 2022
Artemio Gabriel Casas, appointed 1st Bishop of Imus in 1961; later returned to the archdiocese as auxiliary bishop
Antonio Realubin Tobias, appointed auxiliary bishop of Zamboanga in 1982, then bishop of the Diocese of Pagadian, Diocese of San Fernando in La Union, and finally Diocese of Novaliches until retirement in 2019
Francisco Capiral San Diego, appointed Coadjutor Vicar Apostolic of Palawan in 1983, then became Apostolic Vicar of Apostolic Vicariate of Puerto Princesa, 2nd bishop of the Diocese of San Pablo, Laguna and later 1st bishop of the Diocese of Pasig.
Mylo Hubert Claudio Vergara (priest here, 1990-2003), appointed Bishop of Diocese of San Jose in Nueva Ecija in 2005 and later appointed as current bishop of the Diocese of Pasig
Francisco Mendoza de Leon, Auxiliary Bishop of the Diocese of Antipolo (September 1, 2007 – November 21, 2015), Coadjutor Bishop of Antipolo (November 22, 2015 – September 10, 2016) and 5th Bishop of the Diocese of Antipolo (September 10, 2016–present).
Ruperto Cruz Santos, 4th Bishop of the Diocese of Balanga (July 8, 2010–present)
Roberto Orendain Gaa, 3rd Bishop of the Diocese of Novaliches (August 24, 2019–present)
Jose Alan Verdejo Dialogo, 5th Bishop of the Diocese of Sorsogon (October 15, 2019–present)
Socrates Villegas, 3rd Bishop of the Diocese of Balanga (July 3, 2004 – November 4, 2009) and 5th Archbishop of the Archdiocese of Lingayen-Dagupan (November 4, 2009–present)

Demographics 
As of 2004, the archdiocese has registered a total of 2,719,781 baptized faithful. They are served by 475 diocesan and religious priests – with a ratio of 5,725 faithful per priest, under 85 parishes. The archdiocese also houses 369 male religious and 1,730 female religious engaged in various social, pastoral and missionary works in various areas of the archdiocese.

Formation of priests 

The archdiocese administers San Carlos Seminary, the archdiocesan major seminary which caters to the formation of future priests for the archdiocese and for its suffragan dioceses. Located in Guadalupe Viejo, Makati, it has a pre-college program (senior high school and formation year), a college program (A.B., philosophy), and a graduate school (master's program in theology or pastoral ministry), as well as a formation houses for future priests committed to serve the Filipino-Chinese communities in the country (Lorenzo Ruiz Mission Society) and a center for adult vocations (Holy Apostles Senior Seminary). The archdiocese also operates Our Lady of Guadalupe Minor Seminary for young men at the secondary school level. It is located a few blocks from San Carlos Seminary.

Schools 

The Roman Catholic Archbishop of Manila Educational System (RCAMES) comprises 27 archdiocesan and parochial schools. The archbishop of Manila exercises authority in each member school and appoints a superintendent for the entire system to implement decisions and resolve issues. The member schools are:

See also 
 List of Catholic dioceses in the Philippines
 Roman Catholicism in the Philippines
 The Royal and Conciliar San Carlos Seminary

References 

Sources
Population of the Archdiocese of Manila Statistics of Manila Archdiocese
 

Gregory XIII, Pope, 1502–1585. "Bull for erection of the Diocese and Cathedral Church of Manila."  In The Philippine Islands, 1493–1898. Cleveland, Ohio: A.H. Clark Company, 1903–9. Vol. 4, 1576–82. Pp. 119–124.
 5 Seminaries under the Archdiocese of Manila
COFOR – The Roman Catholic Archdiocese of Manila

External links
  

Manila
Archdiocese
Manila